Cathedral Basilica of St. Mary may refer to:

 Cathedral Basilica of St. Mary (Trujillo, Peru)
 Cathedral Basilica of St. Mary (Panama City), Panama
 Cathedral Basilica of St. Mary, Oradea, Romania
 Cathedral Basilica of St. Mary, Ayacucho, Peru